Methylphosphine is the simplest organophosphorus compound with the formula CH3PH2, often written MePH2.  It is a malodorous gas that condenses to a colorless liquid. It can be produced by methylation of phosphide salts:
KPH2  +  MeI   →   MePH2  +  KI

Reactions
The compound exhibits the properties characteristic of a primary phosphine, i.e., a compound of the type RPH2.  It can be oxidized to methylphosphonous acid:
MePH2  +  O2  →   MeP(H)O2H
It protonates to give the phosphonium ion:
MePH2  +  H+  →   MePH3+
With strong bases, it can be deprotonated to give methylphosphide derivatives:
MePH2  +  KOH  →   K[MePH]  +  H2O

References

Phosphines
Foul-smelling chemicals